Cottonwood is an unincorporated community in Coal County, Oklahoma, United States. It is located two miles northeast of Coalgate. A post office operated in Cottonwood from April 1, 1914 to December 31, 1914.

References

Unincorporated communities in Coal County, Oklahoma
Unincorporated communities in Oklahoma